Crake is an English surname. People with this surname include:

 Augustine David Crake (1836–1890), English cleric and author known for devotional works and juvenile historical fiction
 Francis Crake (1893–1920), British Army and Royal Irish Constabulary officer
 Paul Crake (born 1976), Australian racing cyclist
 Ralph Crake (1882–1952), Scottish first-class cricketer and British Army officer
 William Crake (1852–1921), English footballer

See also
 Joe Crakes (1907–1976), American National Football League player and US Air Force officer